The enzyme phosphatidylinositol deacylase (EC 3.1.1.52) catalyzes the reaction

1-phosphatidyl-D-myo-inositol + H2O  1-acylglycerophosphoinositol + a carboxylate

This enzyme belongs to the family of hydrolases, specifically those acting on carboxylic ester bonds.  The systematic name is 1-phosphatidyl-D-myo-inositol 2-acylhydrolase. Other names in common use include phosphatidylinositol phospholipase A2, and phospholipase A2.

References

 
 

EC 3.1.1
Enzymes of unknown structure